François Ombanzi (born 1 April 1947) is a former Congolese cyclist. He competed in the team time trial at the 1968 Summer Olympics.

References

1947 births
Living people
Democratic Republic of the Congo male cyclists
Olympic cyclists of the Democratic Republic of the Congo
Cyclists at the 1968 Summer Olympics
Sportspeople from Kinshasa
21st-century Democratic Republic of the Congo people